Situbondo Regency is a regency (kabupaten) of East Java province, Indonesia. It covers an area of 1,638.50 km2, and had a population of 647,619 at the 2010 Census and 685,967 at the 2020 Census. It is located in east end of Java before Banyuwangi. The administrative centre is Situbondo, a small town within the regency. One of the famous tourist sites is Baluran National Park.

Administrative districts 
The Regency is divided into seventeen districts (kecamatan), tabulated below with their areas and their population totals from the 2010 Census and the 2020 Census. The table also includes the location of the district headquarters and the number of administrative villages (rural desa and urban kelurahan) in each district.

Climate
Situbondo has a tropical savanna climate (Aw) with heavy rainfall from December to March and moderate to little rainfall from April to November.

History

Demographic Information

Future Projects

Gallery

References